Rabigh 2 IPP (R2IPP) is a Combined Cycle Power Station project under construction on the western coast of Saudi Arabia, 150 km north of Jeddah. R2IPP will have an installed electrical generating capacity of 2,060 megawatts to supply Makkah Province with electric power. The project will deliver electricity to Saudi Electricity Company under the Power Purchase Agreement which has a term of 20 years from the scheduled commercial operations date of June 2020.

Technology

The project will utilize Natural Gas as main fuel and Arabian Super Light (ASL) as backup fuel and with the application of Combined Cycle Power Station in a configuration of three blocks, each composed of two Gas Turbines of enhanced efficiency, two Heat Recovery Steam Generators and one triple pressure Steam Turbine which will substantially reduce the fuel consumption, the impact on sea water temperatures and carbon emissions to the environment. R2IPP comprises 4 identical power blocks, each delivering a net output of 686.5 MW. For each of these units, Siemens is delivering two model SGT6-5000F gas turbines, one model SST6-5000 HI-L steam turbine, and three SGen6-1000A-series electrical generators. It will be the first IPP with a gross thermal efficiency of 58.8% at reference site conditions.

Shareholders

The shareholder structure of Al Mourjan For Electricity Production Company is as follows:
 ACWA Power
 Samsung C&T Corporation
 Saudi Electricity Company

EPC contractor

Samsung C&T Corporation has been appointed as EPC contractor.

Milestone dates

Contract Signing: December 25, 2013
Completion: June 25, 2020

See also 

 Qurayyah IPP
 Shuqaiq 2 IWPP
 List of largest power stations in the world
 List of power stations in Saudi Arabia

References 

Fossil fuel power stations in Saudi Arabia
Oil-fired power stations in Saudi Arabia
Power stations in Saudi Arabia